Broadway may refer to:

Theatre
 Broadway Theatre (disambiguation)
 Broadway theatre, theatrical productions in professional theatres near Broadway, Manhattan, New York City, U.S.
 Broadway (Manhattan), the street
Broadway Theatre (53rd Street), one theatre on Broadway

Other arts, entertainment, and media

Films
 Broadway (1929 film), based on the play by George Abbott and Philip Dunning
 Broadway (1942 film), with George Raft, Pat O'Brien, Janet Blair and Broderick Crawford

Music

Groups and labels
 Broadway (band), an American post-hardcore band
 Broadway (disco band), an American disco band from the 1970s
 Broadway Records (disambiguation)

Albums
 Broadway (album), a 1964 Johnny Mathis album released in 2012
 Broadway, a 2011 album by Kika Edgar

Songs
 "Broadway" (Goo Goo Dolls song), a song from the album Dizzy Up the Girl (1998)
 "Broadway" (Sébastien Tellier song), a song by Sébastien Tellier from his album Politics (2004)
 "Broadway" (1940 song), a 1940 jazz standard by Billy Byrd, Teddy McRae and Henri Woode
 "Broadway", song by the Clash from the album Sandinista! (1980)
 "Broadway", a song performed by Alison Krauss on the album Now That I've Found You: A Collection (1995)
 "Broadway", a song performed by Old 97's on their album Too Far to Care (1997)
 "Broadway (So Many People)", a song by Low from The Great Destroyer (2005)

Other
 Broadway Journal, magazine owned, edited, and featuring work by Edgar Allan Poe
 Broadway (play), a 1926 play written and directed by George Abbott and Philip Dunning
 Broadway (gargoyle), a character in the animated television series Gargoyles
 "Broadway", a poker term for a straight from ace to 10

Businesses and organizations

Australia
 Broadway on the Mall, Brisbane, a former shopping centre, Queensland
 Broadway Shopping Centre, Sydney, New South Wales

Hong Kong
 Broadway Circuit, a cinema chain in Hong Kong
 Broadway Cinematheque, in Hong Kong

Philippines
 GMA Broadway Centrum, a TV studio, New Manila, Quezon City

United Kingdom
 Broadway Cinema, Nottingham
 Broadway Shopping Centre, Bexleyheath, London
 The Broadway, Bradford, England, a shopping centre

United States
 Broadway at the Beach, shopping center and entertainment complex, Myrtle Beach, South Carolina
 Broadway Books, publisher
 Broadway Tower (San Antonio), a high-rise condominium tower in San Antonio, Texas
 Broadway Video, an American multimedia company that produces Saturday Night Live 
 The Broadway, a former department store chain owned by Carter Hawley Hale Stores
 Navy Broadway Complex, a military facility in Downtown San Diego, California

People
 "Broadway Joe", nickname for American football player Joe Namath (born 1943)
 Broadway Jones (1898–1977), Major League Baseball pitcher
 Allan Broadway (1921–1997), Australian rules footballer in the Victorian Football League
 Christine Broadway, Australian actress
 Geoff Broadway (1911–1978), New Zealand former middle-distance runner
 Lance Broadway (born 1983), American actor and former Major League Baseball pitcher
 Remi Broadway (born 1978), Australian actor
 Rod Broadway (born 1955), American football coach
 Shane Broadway (born 1972), American politician
 Tony Broadway, a ring name of an American professional wrestler James Maritato (born 1972)
 Broadway Rose, nickname of several members of the Gorgeous Ladies of Wrestling

Places

Municipalities

Canada
 Broadway (electoral district), Manitoba
 Broadway, Nova Scotia

United Kingdom
 Broadway, London, City of Westminster, England
 Broadway, Somerset, England
 Broadway, The Havens, Pembrokeshire, Wales
 Broadway, Worcestershire, England

United States
 Broadway, Missouri
 Broadway, Newark, New Jersey
 Broadway, New Jersey, within Franklin Township
 Broadway, North Carolina
 Broadway, Ohio
 Broadway, Virginia

Other places
 Broadway, New South Wales (Upper Lachlan), Australia
 Broadway, County Wexford, Ireland
 Broadway, Durban, South Africa

Roads

Canada
 Broadway Avenue (Saskatoon), Saskatchewan
 Broadway (Vancouver), British Columbia
 Broadway (Winnipeg), Manitoba, Canada

United States

New York City
 Broadway (Brooklyn)
 Broadway (Manhattan), continuing into the Bronx and Westchester County
 Broadway (Queens)

Elsewhere in U.S.
 Broadway (Albany, New York)
 Broadway (Baltimore), Maryland
 Broadway (Chicago), Illinois
 Broadway (Cleveland), Ohio
 Broadway, Denver, Colorado
 Broadway (Everett), Washington
 Broadway (Gary), Indiana
 Broadway, Granville, Ohio
 Broadway (Laguna Beach), California
 Broadway Corridor, Long Beach, California
 Broadway (Los Angeles), California
 Broadway (Minot, North Dakota)
 Broadway (Nashville, Tennessee)
 Broadway, Phoenix and Tempe, Arizona
 Broadway (Portland, Oregon)
 Broadway (San Francisco), California
 Broadway (Seattle), Washington
 Broadway, San Antonio, Texas
 Broadway (Santa Maria), California
 Broadway, Santa Monica, California
 Broadway (Tampa), Florida
 Broadway Boulevard, Tucson, Arizona

Other countries
 Broadway, Chennai, India
 Broadway, Kochi, India
 Broadway, Letchworth, Hertfordshire, England
 Broadway, Newmarket, New Zealand
 Broadway, Sydney, New South Wales, Australia
 Broadway Market, Hackney, London, England

Transport

New York City lines and stations
 BMT Broadway Line, a New York City Subway line
 BMT Jamaica Line, also known as the Broadway Line, a New York City Subway line
 Broadway (IND Crosstown Line), a subway station, Williamsburg, Brooklyn
 Broadway (BMT Astoria Line), a subway station in Queens
 Broadway (BMT Myrtle Avenue Line), a disused New York City Subway station
 Broadway (LIRR station), a commuter rail station, Flushing, Queens
 Broadway Junction (New York City Subway), a subway station complex, Brooklyn
 IRT Broadway–Seventh Avenue Line, a New York City Subway line

Other uses in transport
 Broadway (cyclecar), a British 4-wheeled cyclecar made only in 1913
 Broadway station (MBTA), a subway station in South Boston, Massachusetts, U.S.
 Broadway (NJT station), an NJ Transit train station on the Bergen County Line located in Fair Lawn, New Jersey
 Broadway (PATCO station), a station in the Walter Rand Transportation Center in Camden, New Jersey
 Broadway (Sacramento RT), a light rail station in Sacramento, California, U.S.
 Broadway Limited, a former Pennsylvania Railroad passenger train between New York City and Chicago, U.S.
 Broadway railway station, a former Great Western Railway station under reconstruction, Worcestershire, England
 Broadway station (Caltrain) in Burlingame, California, U.S.
 Broadway station (Detroit), a Detroit People Mover station in Downtown Detroit, Michigan, U.S.
 Broadway (Chennai), a bus terminus in India
 HMS Broadway, a ship of the British Royal Navy
 Ealing Broadway station, a London Underground and National Rail station
 Fulham Broadway tube station, a London Underground station
 Tooting Broadway tube station, a London Underground station
 Renault Broadway, versions of the Renault 9 car
Broadway Subway Project, an under-construction extension of the Millennium Line in Vancouver, Canada

Other uses
 Broadway (microprocessor), code name of a computer chip in Nintendo's Wii gaming console
 Broadway (typeface), a decorative typeface
 Broadway, GTK+ computer software

See also 

 Broadway Academy, a secondary school and academy in Birmingham, England
 Broadway Bridge (disambiguation)
 Broadway Market (disambiguation)
 Broadway Rastus (disambiguation)
 Broadway Station (disambiguation)
 Old Broadway Synagogue, an Orthodox Jewish synagogue in New York City
 On Broadway (disambiguation)
 Broadwey, Weymouth, England